Events in the year 2018 in Sierra Leone.

Incumbents
 President: Ernest Bai Koroma (until 4 April); Julius Maada Bio (from 4 April)

Events

7 March – Sierra Leonean general election, 2018

4 April – Julius Maada Bio took over as new president of Sierra Leone

Deaths

2 April – Ahmed Janka Nabay, musician (b. 1964).

References

 
2010s in Sierra Leone 
Years of the 21st century in Sierra Leone 
Sierra Leone 
Sierra Leone